Aaron LaBerge  is an American technology executive and the chief technology officer (CTO) of Disney Media and Entertainment Distribution. He has been recognised as an innovator in content delivery and sports coverage.

Early life
LaBerge was born in Charleston, South Carolina and went on to attend The University of South Carolina in Columbia, South Carolina; he graduated with a B.S. in Computer Science & Engineering in 1996.

Career 
LaBerge joined The Walt Disney Company in 1997 after Disney acquired Starwave Ventures.  Before Starwave Ventures, he was a senior software engineer at Renaissance Interactive, which specialized in Internet-based content management and publishing.

From 2007 to 2013, LaBerge was CEO of a venture-funded consumer software company he co-founded, Fanzter Inc.  He directed the development of the business and the launch of its consumer-focused Internet and mobile suite of products.

Prior to joining DTCI, LaBerge served as the CTO of ESPN starting from 2015 and served as an advisor on the Disney Research Advisory Board. During his tenure at ESPN as a senior vice president starting in 2013, LaBerge was instrumental in the construction and design of ESPN's second Digital Center in Bristol, Connecticut.

In 2018, LaBerge was named EVP and CTO of Walt Disney Direct-to-Consumer & International and first reported to Kevin A. Mayer, who was chairman of the segment at the time. In 2020, LaBerge became CTO of the new Disney Media and Entertainment Distribution segment chaired by Kareem Daniel.

Recognition
LaBerge won a Sports Emmy in 2016 as an Innovator for his involvement with Megacast and was nominated the same year for the ESPN Pylon Camera.

He was featured in Variety’s inaugural Digital Innovators list as an executive who is looking to “set a new bar” using “tech to directly connect and engage with audiences.”

References

Year of birth missing (living people)
Living people
American chief operating officers
Executives
Chief technology officers
technology officers
Alumni